Marc Esposito (born 16 July 1952) is a French film director and screenwriter. Esposito
was first a journalist, critic and press manager. He created two movie magazines: "Premiere" with Jean-Pierre Frimbois in 1976, and "Studio Magazine" in 1987. His film Patrick Dewaere was screened out of competition at the 1992 Cannes Film Festival. He directed the film Le Coeur des Hommes in 2003 and its two sequels. Since Mon Pote in 2010, Esposito is also a producer, with its company: Wayan Productions.

Filmography
 Patrick Dewaere (1992)
 Le Cœur des hommes (2003)
 Toute la beauté du monde (2006)
 Le coeur des hommes 2 (2007)
 Mon pote" (2010)
 Le coeur des hommes 3 (2013)

Co-screenwriting
L'envol de Steve Suissa (2000)

Writing
  Toute la beaute du monde Novel (1999)
Au Coeur des Hommes Essay (2007)
’’Mémoires d’un enfant du cinéma - Les années Première’’ Memories (2019)

Theater
Rendez-vous en boite (2014) Play, created at La Gaite Montparnasse theater

References

External links

1952 births
Living people
French film directors
French male screenwriters
French screenwriters